Kurozuka ("black mound") is the grave of an onibaba in Nihonmatsu, Fukushima Prefecture (previously Oodaira), Adachi District or the legend of that onibaba. It lives in Adachigahara (the name of the eastern shore of Abukuma River as well as the eastern base of Mount Adatara) and it is told in legends as the "Onibaba of Adachigahara." The Kurozuka is actually the name of the mound in which this onibaba is buried, but nowadays it can also be used to refer to the onibaba as well. Also based on this legend are the noh titled Kurozuka, the nagauta and kabuki performance Adachigahara, and the kabuki jōruri Ōshū Adachigahara.

Legend
According to the Ōshū Adachigahara Kurozuka Engi published by the temple Mayumisan Kanze-ji near Adachigahara, the legend of the onibaba is told as follows.

Furthermore, though it was not in the Jinki era (the early Nara Period), Yūkei was a person who did actually exist in the Heian Period, and in publications like the Edo meisho zue, he is written about under the name of "Tōkōbō Ajari Yūkei" and is written to have died in 1163 (in the years of Chōkan).

Variations
There are certain variations on how the onibaba story played out.
From the power of the Guanyin statue, there was a thunderous roar and a lightning strike that killed the onibaba.
The onibaba was not actually killed, but was reformed by the high priest and returned to the ways of Buddha.
Yūkei desperately ran from the onibaba, and when dawn came, he was able to lose the onibaba from pursuit.
There is also a legend where Yūkei did not happen upon the onibaba by chance, but came to Adachigahara with the intent to slay the onibaba, as follows:

The temple Tōkō-ji where the onibaba's head was stored later became abandoned, and the skull has been passed down along Yūkei's descendants, the Adachi family. The name of the family, Adachi, also comes from Adachigahara, and there has been none of the name Adachi that has been confirmed to be near Oyama. Also, the cherry tree that was planeted where the body was buried later was said to have grown into a splendid big tree that blooms beautiful flowers each year.

Origin of the onibaba
Near the aforementioned Kanze-ji, there is a jizō statue named Koigoromo Jizō and it is stated to deify a woman who was killed by the onibaba, Koigoromo. As the origin of this jizō statue, there is the following legend concerning how the onibaba was a human transformed into an onibaba.

Also, the "kuge" that Iwate served was a word used starting from the age of buke, but the Jinki era when the Heian capital has not even been built, so there is also the contradiction that in the era in which Iwate served the aristocratic family, her place of service, Kyō no Miyako, did not even exist. Also, the name "Iwate" was a made-up name from a play titled Iwate, so there is no way a person named that could have really existed. For these reasons, this legend concerning the onibaba's origins is seen as a tale that was made up afterwards as a means to try to fill in the gaps.

Also, in the Aomori Prefecture, there is a different legend concerning the origin of the onibaba:

Landmarks and other
It is said that near Kurozuka, Yūkei built a temple to deify Guanyin, and in present-day this is considered to be the Mayumisan Kanze-ji (4-126 Adachigahara, Nihonmatsu, Fukushima Prefecture) in the city of Nihonmatsu. In the grounds of this temple, other than a statue of the onibaba, there is also a grave for the onibaba, the cave where the onibaba lived, and the pond where the onibaba is said to have washed the blood-soaked knife, and there are many visitors to this temple. It is said that even after such a long time after the time of the legend, it continues to inspire fear and sorrow in people's hearts, and the haiku poet Masaoka Shiki also visited this temple, writing "Suzushisaya/kikeba mukashi wa/oni no tsuka" (this coolness.../if you ask, it was in the past/the mound of an oni). Also, in the womb of the Nyoirin Kan'non Bosatsu at Kanze-ji, the Nyoirin Kan'non Bosatsu statue that Yūkei used in the slaying of the onibaba is buried within, and it has been open to the public for about 60 years.

In the tourist attraction building "Adachigahara Furusato-Mura" in the city of Nihonmatsu, and other than the "Kurozuka Theatre" re-enacting the legend of the onibaba, there is also the mascot character "Bappy-chan," a deformation of the onibaba into a figure with two heads for wiping away the creepiness of the legend, among other creations. The Kurozuka Theatre uses a shōji instead of a curtain in front and behind it, and the story is told by an elaborate robot in the shape of the onibaba, and it was performed in the style of having two stages where midway through the guests would turn around 180 degrees for the performance to continue on the other side, but ever since the "Furusato-Mura" has been open to all free of charge, the Kurozaki Theatre has closed and it is now no longer possible to see it.

Taira no Kanemori's tanka
One of the Thirty-Six Immortals of Poetry from the Heian Period, Taira no Kanemori, wrote:

in the Shūi Wakashū, volume 9, second half. This was a love poem sent by Kanemori to the younger siblings of another of the Thirty-Six Immortals of Poetry, Minamoto no Shigeyuki, who lived at Kurozuka. To call those sisters "oni" was a joke about how young girls in the neighboring country of Mutsu were kept in seclusion as they were raised and thus hidden away to never show themselves.

It is sometimes said that the legend of the onibaba existed before the time of Kanemori, and Kanemori was simply writing a poem about that, but there is also the theory that this poem existed before the legend, and that this poem was later interpreted literally to mean that there was an onibaba living in Kurozaka, giving birth to the legend.

Legends by area
There is a similar legend told in Saitama, Saitama Prefecture about the legend of an "Onibaba at Kurozuka." A chorography of Musashi Province from the Edo period, the Shinpen Musashi Fudoki Kō, states that Yūkei was the one who lifted the curse of the evil oni at Kurozuka in Adachigahara in an eastern province and names him Tōkōbō, additionally stating that this was all within the aforementioned tanka by Taira no Kamemori. An inscription on a bell at the temple Tōkō-ji also says that what was once the old tomb called Kurozuka in Adachi District was the place where Yūkei defeated a suffering-inflicting yōkai with the miraculous power of Buddha. In the Kanpō period book titled Shokoku Rijin Dan, this legend was the original, and before the Shōwa period, Saitama was a more famous place owing to its greater proximity to Tokyo, so there were many who supported the view that the one from Saitama was the original. When the kabuki Kurozuka is performed, sometimes the actors would make a pilgrimage to this place.

In the beginning of the Shōwa period, there was an outbreak of controversy over which onibaba legend from was the original: the one from Adachigahara in Fukushima or the one from Adachigahara in Saitama. Here, the folkloricist Masayoshi Nishitsunoi stepped in and argued "to say that our lands was where the onibaba originated is pretty much to advertise our land as an undeveloped, savage land, so it'd be better to give up our claims" towards those on the Saitama side to convince them to give up on it, ending the debate. The Tōkō-ji that was once at Kurozuka was then moved to Ōmiya-ku in Saitama, and the place that was Kurozuka was later developed as residential lands, so there is no sight left behind to see.

In the southern part of Morioka, Iwate Prefecture at a place called Kurikawa, there is also a legend of an onibaba at Adachigahara, and the true identity of this onibaba was considered to be the daughter of the mid-Heian period general Abe no Sadato. There is a similar legend in the Uda regions of Nara Prefecture, and the Asajigahara no Onibaba from Taitō ward, Tokyo is also the same kind of legend. In the Ansei period yōkai emaki, the Tosa Obake Zōshi about Tosa Province (now Kōchi Prefecture), under the title "kijo" (oni woman), there is the statement, "to speak of Adachigahara, there is this."

According to a book titled Tengu Research (Tengu no Kenkyū) by the Tengu researcher Kōsai Chigiri, the "Tōkōbō" in "Tōkōbō Yūkei" comes from the name a place that served as base of the Kumano region shugen practitioners called Tōkōbō, which was the top of the Kumano springs, and as the yamabushi went around various lands in their training, they all called themselves "Tōkōbō Yūkei of Nachi," so it can be seen that all those yamabushi who called themselves Yūkei was the origin of all these onibaba legends, giving birth to onibaba and Kurozuka legends in many different parts of Japan.

There is also a theory that the aforementioned Onibaba legend of Saitama comes from a misreporting of how the shinshoku of Hikawa Shrine would cover and hide their bare faces with masks whenever they try to break their prohibition from catching and eating fish or birds.

Characteristics
The Onibaba has the appearance of a shriveled old woman. Some of her more distinctive features include having a disheveled, maniacal appearance, wild-looking hair, and an oversized mouth. She is sometimes depicted with a kitchen knife or sitting with a spool of thread. She often conceals her demonic appearance in order to put visitors into a false sense of security.

There is a small museum in Adachigahara that is said to hold her remains as well as the cooking pot and knife that she used on her victims.

Portrayal
Onibaba has many stories behind her name.

Tale of origin
One version of the story of the creation of the Onibaba involves the baby girl of a wealthy family in Kyoto. Although already five-years-old and otherwise healthy and happy, the child had not uttered a sound since birth. Worried and desperate, the family consulted doctor after doctor with no success until they came upon a fortune teller who told them that the cure was to feed the girl the fresh liver of a living fetus. This gruesome task was passed on to her nanny who set off on the search after leaving her own similarly aged daughter an omamori, an amulet for protection. The nanny's search for a woman willing to give up her unborn child's liver lasted for weeks and months before the nanny, tired and weary, reached Adachigahara, where she decided to stay in a cave to wait for pregnant travelers to pass by. Years passed before a lone pregnant woman approached her cave. Desperate, the nanny jumped upon the woman and retrieved the fetus' liver. Only after accomplishing her goal did she realize that the woman was wearing the omamori she had given her daughter many years ago. Driven insane by this realization, the nanny became a yōkai and from then on attacked passers-by and ate their flesh.

In another version of the story, the nanny goes on the trip because she loves the child she is nursing. In this version, the nanny has no daughter – the cure is a pregnant woman's liver instead of the fetus' liver.

Noh play
There is a Noh play by the name of Kurozuka that tells the story of two priests who stop by the hut of the Onibaba in Adachi. The Onibaba, in her human form, kindly lets them in and speaks to them about her loneliness while spinning thread. Later, she leaves to gather firewood, but tells the priests not to look into the inner room of the house. Curious, the servant disobeys and the priests find that the inner room is filled with the bones and rotting corpses of people. They realize that the woman is the goblin of Adachi. As they are about to run away, the Onibaba returned, outraged, and in her demon form. They were able to escape through the power of their Buddhist prayers.

Film
In 1964, Scriptwriter and Director Kaneto Shindō made the film Onibaba based upon an old Buddhist fable by the name of "A Mask with Flesh Scared a Wife." The fable tells the tale of a woman who, jealous of her daughter-in-law, dons a mask and tries to scare the girl and stop her from meeting her lover. The woman fails because the daughter-in-law's love is much stronger than her fear of the supposed-demon. As punishment from Buddha, the mask permanently bonds to her face.

Transformed use
In stark contrast to the original portrayals of the Onibaba, the Onibaba has undergone a few striking transformations. One example is that of Bappy-chan, the Onibaba mascot of the Adachigahara Furusatomura Village, a tourist destination in Japan depicting a replica of a traditional Japanese village that lies on the Onibaba's stomping grounds. Unsurprisingly, Bappy-chan has horns and fangs, sports an angry face, and is posed in a fashion as if she were about to chase after viewers. But controversially according to her original image, she is drawn in a super-deformed fashion that gives her a harmless, cute, and loveable appearance. The Village sells merchandise featuring Bappy-chan and even offers a virtual Onibaba for download on their website.

Another example of the transformation of Onibaba is the anime and manga Kurozuka. In this series the Noh story of the Onibaba is portrayed, with the Onibaba masquerading as a beautiful woman with a slender body and long dark hair and with powers similar to a vampire. The difference between the Noh story and the series is that instead of the two priests escaping, one of the men, a feudal lord, falls in love with the Onibaba in her beautiful form and is transformed into a vampire by the Onibaba and her vampiristic powers.

Notes

References

Buddhist folklore
History of Fukushima Prefecture
Geography of Fukushima Prefecture
Japanese folklore